Caripeta canidiaria is a species of geometrid moth in the family Geometridae. It is found in Central America and North America.

The MONA or Hodges number for Caripeta canidiaria is 6872.

References

Further reading

External links

 

Ourapterygini
Articles created by Qbugbot
Moths described in 1899